Lancelot C. Ewbank House, also known as the Ewbank-Loudermilk House, is a historic home located in Penn Township, Parke County, Indiana. It was built in 1883, and is a two-story, "T"-plan, high-style Italianate style brick dwelling with a truncated hipped roof.  It features round-arched windows, decorative scroll brackets, and a wooden porch with intricate decorative elements.  Also on the property is a contributing summer kitchen.

It was added to the National Register of Historic Places in 1988.

References

Houses on the National Register of Historic Places in Indiana
Italianate architecture in Indiana
Houses completed in 1883
Buildings and structures in Parke County, Indiana
National Register of Historic Places in Parke County, Indiana